The epitaph of Pugu Yitu is an inscription found inside the tomb of Pugu Yitu (635-678). It dates to 678 and was found in 2009 by a joint Russian-Mongolian team in Zaamar sum, Tov Province, 160 km west of Ulaanbaatar, Mongolia about 2.5 km north-east from the banks of the Tuul River and close to the 10th-century Khitan town of Khermen Denzh on the banks of the Tuul River. The inscription is currently displayed at the Zanabazar Fine Arts Museum in Ulaanbaatar. The tomb of Pugu Yitu, also called the Shoroon Dov Kurgan, showed signs of attempted looting in ancient times. The nearby tomb of Shoroon Bumbagar was never looted and therefore was found to hold far more artifacts including an intact door, many statues and wall paintings of people, dragons and temples, although there was no inscription. The tomb of Pugu Yitu is unusual in that it has an inscription. Apart from the cover inscription of Pugu Yitu measuring 75 cm x 75 cm with 4 lines of 3 characters each, the main inscription has 28 lines with 31 characters each. The language of the inscription is Classical Chinese and relates the biography of Pugu Yitu the Dudu (都督) or Commander-in-Chief of the Jinweizhou (金微州) protectorate under the Tang dynasty's Jimi system. A photo of the inscription can be found on the Mongol Toli website.

History

Pugu Yitu is not mentioned in the Tang histories, although his grandfather Gelan Bayan is. The Pugu clan was part of the Xueyantuo, a Turkic people who filled the power vacuum in northern Mongolia after the Eastern Turkic Khaganate was defeated by the Tang Dynasty in May 630. In 647 the Pugu clan accepted the suzerainty of the Tang dynasty under the Jimi (loose rein) system and received the title Dudu (Commander-in-Chief). The first Dudu was Pugu Yitu's grandfather Gelan Bayan (歌滥拔延), followed by Pugu Yitu's father Sifu (思匍) who governed till 657. Judging from the epitaph Pugu Yitu was 44 years old when he died in 678. This means he was 22 or 23 years old when he succeeded his father Sifu in the post of Dudu in 657. The inscription was laid flat on the ground in front of the brick-faced main chamber where a number of painted statuettes were found. The main chamber was accessed by three arched passageways. Byzantine-style gold coins were also found. According to the inscription, in the second year of Linde (665) he participated with the Tang Emperor Gaozong in a ceremony on Mount Tai in Shandong Province. The inscription also says he carried out military campaigns against the Mohe in Eastern Manchuria as well as Tibetan Empire (吐蕃). It is notable that General Tonyukuk's Bain Tsokto inscriptions, dated 716, are found eastward in the valley of the same Tuul River in Nalaikh District of Ulaanbaatar. In it he states how Tang influence was still strong in his childhood and how it took him many struggles, including campaigns as far afield as Shandong Province, Tibet and Central Asia to overthrow Tang influence and restore the Turkic Khaganate.

Inscription
The cover inscription has the following text:
大唐金/微都督/仆固府/君墓志 (Memorial inscription of the Gentlemanly Lord of Pugu Prefecture of Jinweizhou of the Great Tang)

The main inscription has the following text:

Artifacts from the tomb
The epitaph was found within the tomb of Pugu Yitu, also called the Shoroon Dov Kurgan. Many artifacts, especially terracotta statuettes, were found in the tomb.

References

Archaeology of Mongolia
Tang dynasty people
Xueyantuo
2009 archaeological discoveries